Eva Korpela (born 1958) is a former Swedish biathlete, world champion and world cup winner.

World championships
She received a bronze medal in the 10 km individual at the 1985 Biathlon World Championships in Egg am Etzel, and a gold medal in Falun in 1986.

She received a bronze medal in the 5 km sprint in 1986, and a silver medal in Chamonix in 1988. 

She participated in the Swedish team that received silver medals in the 3 × 5 km relay in 1986 and 1987, and a bronze medal in 1988.

World Cup
Korpela won the overall Biathlon World Cup in the 1985/86 season, and again in the 1986/87 season. She finished 2nd in 1984/85.

References

1958 births
Living people
Swedish female biathletes
Biathlon World Championships medalists